Aaravam is a 1978 Indian Malayalam film, directed by Bharathan. The film stars Nedumudi Venu, Prameela, Pratap Pothan, KPAC Lalitha, Bahadoor and Janardhanan in the lead roles. Actor Pratap Pothan was introduced in this film along with composer Ousepachan, who played the role of a fiddle player. The cinematography was handled by Ashok Kumar. The film has musical score by M. G. Radhakrishnan and background score by Johnson and Ousepachan. The story revolves around Marudhu, a village hunter and wanderer and his love interest named Kaveri, in the village, who runs a tea shop and how their life affected by the arrival of a Circus group in the village. It was a commercial failure.

Plot
The movie starts with a Hunting scene of Maruthu (Nedumudi Venu). He is a very distorted person. Maruthu hunts rabbits and local birds for a living. Kaveri runs a tea shop in the name of Kadavul Sahayam tea shop. Anthony is the bus driver in that village. Kaveri has affair with Anthony and Maruthu. But she cares more about Maruthu. Upon her request Maruthu stays with her as caretaker and so called Husband, this makes Anthony angry. Another different character in the movie is Kokkarako annan (Prathap Pothan). He is fond of chickens, always keep two in hands. He consider them as his sons. One day Circus team comes to that Village and they got impressed by the tricks of Maruthu. Maruthu agrees to join them. He gets close to stripping girl. This make Kaveri a little desperate.

Cast

Nedumudi Venu as Maruthu
Prameela as Kaveri
KPAC Lalitha as Alamelu
Prathap Pothen as Kokkarakko Annan
Kottayam Santha as Mrs. Murukayya
Ouseppachan
Manavalan Joseph
Pattom Sadan
Maniyanpilla Raju
Bahadoor as Murukayya
Janardanan as Anthony
Suchitra
 Ouseppachan as fiddle player
 Hamza
 Sudheer Kumar
 Basheer

Soundtrack
The music was composed by M. G. Radhakrishnan and the lyrics were written by Kavalam Narayana Panicker.

References

External links
 
 

1978 films
1970s Malayalam-language films
Films scored by Ouseppachan